The ghost nudibranch, Lecithophorus capensis, is a species of dorid nudibranch, and is only found in South Africa. It is a marine gastropod mollusc in the family Polyceridae. It is the sole species of the genus Lecithophorus.

Distribution
This species is endemic to the South African coast and is found on both sides of the Cape Peninsula from the intertidal to at least 30 m.

Description
The ghost nudibranch is an almost transparent animal with a deep body and an opaque white margin. Its digestive system is visible as a purple mass in the posterior end of its body. Its rhinophores and gills are white.

Ecology
The ghost nudibranch feeds on colonial sea squirts and bryozoans.

References

Polyceridae
Gastropods described in 1958